The 12980/12979 Jaipur–Bandra Terminus Superfast Express is a Superfast train belonging to Indian Railways that runs between  and  in India.

It operates as train number 12980 from Jaipur Junction to Bandra Terminus and as train number 12979 in the reverse direction. It runs on every Monday, Wednesday and Friday from Jaipur Junction and on every Tuesday, Thursday and Saturday from Bandra Terminus.

Coaches

The train has LHB coaches that run at maximum speed of 130 kmph. The train consists of 22 coaches:

 1 AC I cum AC II Tier
 2 AC II Tier
 6 AC III Tier
 7 Sleeper coaches
 4 General Unreserved
 2 Generator cum Luggage Rake

As with most train services in India, coach composition may be amended at the discretion of Indian Railways depending on demand.

Service

12980  Jaipur–Bandra Terminus Superfast Express covers the distance of 1148 kilometres in 16 hours 45 mins (70 km/hr) & in 16 hours 40 mins (70 km/hr) as 12979 Bandra Terminus–Jaipur Superfast Express.

As the average speed of the train is above 55 km/hr, as per Indian Railways rules, its fare includes a Superfast surcharge.

Route and halts 

The important halts of the train are:

Schedule

Direction reversal

Traction

Prior to Western Railways switching to AC traction, it would get a Vadodara-based WAP-4E or locomotive until  after which a WCAM-1 would take over until Bandra Terminus.

Western Railways completed DC electric conversion to AC on 5 February 2012 & it is now regularly hauled by a Vadodara-based WAP-7 or WAP-7 locomotive from  until Bandra Terminus.

References 

Transport in Jaipur
Transport in Mumbai
Express trains in India
Rail transport in Maharashtra
Rail transport in Gujarat
Rail transport in Rajasthan
Rail transport in Madhya Pradesh